Shyamvarn is a mountain of the Garhwal Himalaya in Uttarakhand India. The peak lies above the Shyamvarn Glacier. It is 150th highest located entirely within the Uttrakhand. Nanda Devi, is the highest mountain in this category. It lies 3.3 km east of Sudarshan Parbat . Saife  lies 2.5 km WSW and it is 3 km ESE of Shwetvarna . It lies 2.8 km South of Yogeshwar .

Climbing history
The first ascent of Shyamvarn ends with a tragedy. An Indian eight member team led by climber Asit Kumar Moitra Climbed Shyamvarn on 26 September 1985. On the way back from the summit, the leader Asit Kumar Moitra slipped and fell 2000 feet to his death.  The team consisted of Samir Bhattacharya, Manas Bardhan, Nabagopal Basak, Ramjan Bose, Krishna Ganguli, Asish Roy and Sanjoy Roy. 

An Indian team from Bombay was led by Ramakant Mahadik. On 20 June 1989 seven member climbed Shyamvarn this is the second ascent of this peak.

Neighboring and subsidiary peaks
Neighboring or subsidiary peaks of Shyamvarn:
 Sudarshan Parbat 
 Yogeshwar 
 Chaturbhuj  
 Matri 
 Swetvarn 
 Kalidhang

Glaciers and rivers

Swetvarn Bamak on the western side. Shyamvarn bamak on the eastern side both these Glaciers are tributaries of Raktvarn Bamak which drain itself at Gangotri Glacier. From the snout of Gangotri Glacier which was called Gomukh emerges Bhagirathi river. one of the main tributaries of river Ganga that later joins Alaknanda River the other main tributaries of river Ganga at Devprayag and became Ganga there after. the word Bamak is used for Glacier in this part of the world.

See also

 List of Himalayan peaks of Uttarakhand

References

Mountains of Uttarakhand
Six-thousanders of the Himalayas
Geography of Chamoli district